Arthur Birch (23 January 1888 – 16 June 1976) was a New Zealand cricketer. He played in two first-class matches for Wellington from 1909 to 1911.

See also
 List of Wellington representative cricketers

References

External links
 

1888 births
1976 deaths
New Zealand cricketers
Wellington cricketers
Cricketers from Wellington City